Freedom Over Me: Eleven Slaves, Their Lives and Dreams Brought to Life by Ashley Bryan is a young adult picture book written and illustrated by Ashley Bryan, published by Atheneum Books for Young Readers in 2016. It is set in a slave-owning state in 1828 and describes the hopes and dreams of eleven slaves listed for sale. It was named a Newbery Honor book in 2017.

Plot summary
The story starts with a poem recounting the thoughts of the slaveowner, Mrs. Mary Fairchilds; after her husband, Cado died, she has decided to have her property appraised to prepare it for sale; afterward, she intends to return to England. The book gives the names and appraised value of each of the 11 slaves owned by the Fairchilds, accompanied by two poems: one describing their work and another describing their dreams.

Development
The book was inspired by an actual appraisal dated July 5, 1828 in the author's collection; the appraisal listed names and values, but not ages. The title is taken from the spiritual Oh, Freedom.

Reception
In 2017, the American Library Association named Freedom Over Me to its list of Newbery Honor winners, alongside Adam Gidwitz's The Inquisitor's Tale and Lauren Wolk's Wolf Hollow.

References

External links
 

2016 children's books
2016 poetry books
American picture books
American poetry books
Young adult poetry books
Newbery Honor-winning works
Works about American slavery
Atheneum Books books
Fiction set in 1828